The Carmel Convent Senior Secondary School in Gwalior, India was founded by the Carmelite Sisters of St. Teresa. St. Teresa helped in the spread of modern English education to the common masses of India. The Carmel Convent School started its first session in the year of 1957.

Affiliated to the CBSE pattern of education, the Carmel Convent School is one of the prominent Gwalior schools that help in imparting modern knowledge coupled with traditional values. The administration of the school of Gwalior still rests in the hands of the Carmelite Sisters.

A registered member of the M.P. Societies Registration Act of 1959, the Carmel Convent School of Gwalior helps in the all around development of the personality of the students. The Carmel Convent School of Gwalior has a branch for the kindergarten students which are popularly known by the name of Little Flower Home. The Carmel Convent Middle School, Hindi Medium imparts knowledge in the national language of India.

The Carmel Convent School believes in inculcating the values of freedom, honesty, integrity and sincerity in the personality of the student. The Carmel Convent School supports qualified and experienced teachers who encourage the students to take part in the extra curricular activities of the school.

The school has a well equipped library that has a vast reserve of books, journals and magazines. The students of Carmel Convent School of Gwalior are free to use the library for enriching their knowledge.

The Carmel Convent School of Gwalior organizes numerous activities for the students that help them to harness their mental faculties.

References

External links

Carmelite educational institutions
Catholic secondary schools in India
Christian schools in Madhya Pradesh
High schools and secondary schools in Madhya Pradesh
Schools in Gwalior
Educational institutions established in 1957
1957 establishments in Madhya Pradesh